Featherlite Coaches is a luxury motor coach manufacturer based in Suffolk, Virginia. It sells through dealers in the United States. 

Featherlite has produced some of the most expensive motor coaches ever made. The company debuted the $2.5 million Platinum Plus in 2006.  

Featherlite is the official luxury coach of NASCAR. Featherlite sponsored the Featherlite Coaches 200 NASCAR race in 2007. Featherlight was a title sponsor for the Featherlight Modified Series from the national tour's inception in 1985 until 2005. It is today known as the Whelen Modified Tour.

Corporate history
Featherlite Coaches was reorganized in 2006 from the assets of Featherlite Luxury Coaches, a division of Featherlite Inc., "a wholly owned subsidiary of Cincinnati based Universal Trailer Holdings Corp", that was previously headed by Conrad Clement. The independent Featherlite company was established in 2006 by Conrad Clement, Tracy Clement and Bulk Resources, Inc. It was purchased by Amadas Coach in 2008.

Products
Featherlite sells "travelers with the luxurious living accommodations and interior choices" and "designs and manufactures coaches in corporate and executive models." The company's products include the Featherlite Vantare' H3-45 and XLII Prevost conversions.

References

External links
Company website

Bus manufacturers of the United States